The Metropolitan Building Act 1855 was an Act of the Parliament of the United Kingdom, concerning standards for buildings within the London "Metropolis", which was separately defined as part of the Metropolis Management Act 1855 passed in the same year. The act was used to regulate the construction, alteration, and safety of buildings within the city, and is the precursor of modern building regulations.

Contents
Part I contains which buildings are in scope (which includes all new buildings and alterations to buildings), and sets out rules for the structure and thickness of walls, roofs, chimneys, stairs, and particulars for party walls. It goes on to set a structure for district surveyors, including granting them powers to inspect and enforce the rules.

Part II covers dangerous structures, defining them and giving city commissioners powers to deal with them

Part III goes into detail on party structures

Part IV covers the miscellaneous provisions, particularly around the powers of courts

Part V repeals previous acts

References

United Kingdom Acts of Parliament 1855
English tort law